Aegypiinae is one of two subfamilies of Accipitridae that are referred to as Old World vultures, the other being the Gypaetinae. They are not closely related to the Gypaetinae, and are instead thought to be the sister group to the serpent-eagles (Circaetinae).

Presently found throughout much of Africa, Asia, and parts of Europe, fossil evidence indicates that as recently as the Late Pleistocene, they ranged into Australia.

Species

Recent genera

Fossil genera 

† = extinct

References 

 
 
Accipitridae
Vultures
Birds of prey